Dellow  cars were made in a factory (owned by Delsons - who produced nuts and bolts) at Alvechurch, just south of Birmingham, England between 1949 and 1956.

Dellow Motors Ltd was started by Ken Delingpole and Ron Lowe to produce road-going sports cars for the enthusiast to use in trials, rallies and hill-climbs.

A small number of very early cars used Austin 7 chassis as per Ron Lowe's special, FUY 374. The other prototypes included OP 3835 owned by Earl "Mick" Heighway, HAB 245 (Eric Penn) CAB 282 (Lewis Tracey) and EDE 384 (Merrick). 
From 1950, with scrap Austin 7's in short supply, an 1172cc Ford 10 engine was utilised in an A-frame chassis with a very light tubular steel framework welded to the chassis and  panelled in aluminium, early cars having no doors. 
The main chassis frame was made from Government-surplus chrome-molybdenum rocket tubes from WW2, these rockets being RP-3 (Rocket Projectile 3 inch) types as used by Hawker Typhoon and Bristol Beaufighter aircraft. Brakes were standard Ford cable/rod operated drums all round.

The tubular A-frame design [supposedly inspired by the pre-war BMW328 chassis] achieved light weight and had a rearward weight bias for trials. Many sporting awards were won by drivers of Dellow cars in the early 1950s, not only in trials but also in other events such as driving tests and hillclimbs. Dellows also took overall honours in the MCC organised Daily Express National Rally and the Circuit of Ireland Rally.
Dellow drivers often shone in other forms of motor sport, Tony Marsh from Kinver went on to become RAC Hill Climb Champion on no less than 6 occasions. Peter Collins from Kidderminster, later drove for HWM, BRM and Vanwall, then for Ferrari.

Dellow styling was created by Lionel Evans at his Radpanels coachbuilding business in Kidderminster. The car evolved through several variants known as Mk I to Mk V. Early cars had the Ford beam front axle with a transverse leaf spring and short Panhard rod, quarter elliptics at the rear and Andre Hartford friction dampers all round. The Ford torque-tube was suitably shortened and the vast majority of cars used the 3-speed Ford gearbox but a very small number of cars (KOX 300 being an example) were produced to customer order with a 4-speed gearbox, from the 10M series Morris. The use of a 4-speed Morris box was pioneered by the "Lightweight" of Tony Marsh.
Wheels were 5-stud from Ford and could be 16" diameter from the Prefect (narrow rim), 16" from the van (wider rim), 17" from the Popular, 18" also from the van.
Later owners often fitted Ballamy 15" wheels in order to use more modern radial tyres. Dellows usually carried twin spare wheels.
Some rolling Dellow chassis were sold to individuals who wished to build their own body [which were rarely as good looking as the factory cars ...]. One or two 'Replicas' have been built since the factory closed ...

The Ford E93A engines were mildly tuned and many used twin SU's on a cast alloy 'Dellow' manifold. However, as an option the factory also offered the car with a Wade-Ventor (Roots type) supercharger installation. 
The MkII saw the introduction of a new and much more robust rear chassis section with coil springs, separate telescopic shock absorbers and a Panhard rod. This stiffer chassis allowed doors to become an optional fitting. 
The Mk V version was derived from the "Lightweight" Dellow (WRF 81) constructed by Tony Marsh for speed events in 1954. It saw coil springs introduced at the front (over telescopic dampers) although still with a one-piece Ford beam axle. 
About 300 Dellows in total are believed to have been constructed at Alvechurch.

Complete cars were available from selected dealers across the country and a now-rare sales leaflet was accordingly produced.
One Dellow owner even towed a caravan for family holidays and a firm of agricultural engineers bought several Dellows for their reps to drive.

A new company, Dellow Engineering, based in Oldbury near Birmingham produced a Mk VI.  It is often incorrectly quoted as having a glass fibre body, but it too was in fact built with alloy panelling. Very few Mk VI's were made.

Cars
 Dellow Prototypes-1947 -     Ford 10 powered Austin 7 chassis.
 Dellow Mk I -     1949 -     Ford 10 powered basic 2 seater (no doors).
 Dellow Mk II -    1951 -     Rear coil springs, telescopic dampers,(optional doors).
 Dellow Mk III -   1952 -     2+2 model.
 Dellow Mk IV -    1954? -    2+2 one-off with Ford Consul engine.
 Dellow Mk V -     1954 -     Coil sprung beam front axle, tuned engine, Mk Vs generally still only had the 3 speed Ford box although the  "Lightweight" WRF 81, now owned by Nigel Brown, had a 4 speed ex-Morris unit.(information from David Haley of the Dellow Register.)
 Dellow Mk VI -    1957 -     Independent front suspension, ladder chassis.

See also
 List of car manufacturers of the United Kingdom

External links
 Dellow Register website
 Site all about Classic Trials with lots of pictures and bits about Dellows in Trials
 Article about Michael Leete's Mk 1 Dellow

Defunct motor vehicle manufacturers of England
Companies based in Worcestershire